Nationality words link to articles with information on the nation's poetry or literature (for instance, Irish or France).

-- From Richard Blackmore's The Kit-Kats. A Poem, Chapter 6, published this year and referring to the Kit-Kat Club in which the influential publisher Jacob Tonson was a prominent member. Tonson was influential in getting recognition for many poets in his series of anthologies.

Events
 July 14 – Joseph Trapp becomes the first Oxford Professor of Poetry.

Works published
 Edmund Arwaker, Truth in Fiction; or, Morality in Masquerade
 Sir Richard Blackmore, The Kit-Cats
 Ebenezer Cooke (also spelled "Cook"), The Sot-Weed Factor: Or, a Voyage to Maryland. A Satyr. In which is describ'd The Laws, Government, Courts, and Constitution of the Country; and also the Buildings, Feasts, Frolics, Entertainments, and Drunken Humours of the Inhabitants of that Part of America, a satirical poem by an English Colonial American in Maryland published in England
 Elijah Fenton, Oxford and Cambridge Miscellany Poems
 John Gay, Wine, published anonymously
 Charles Gildon, Libertas Triumphans, on the battle of Oudenarde, July 11
 Aaron Hill, The Celebrated Speeches of Ajax and Ulysses for the Armour of Achilles, published anonymously, translated from Ovid's Metamorphoses
 William King, The Art of Cookery
 John Philips, Cyder
 Matthew Prior, Poems on Several Occasions, published this year, although the book states "1709"
 Benjamin Tompson, The Gramarrian's Funeral, English Colonial America
 Isaac Watts, Hymns and Spiritual Songs

Births
Death years link to the corresponding "[year] in poetry" article:
 April 23 – Friedrich von Hagedorn (died 1754), German poet
 July 19 – Philip Francis, (died 1773), Anglo-Irish translator, poet and playwright
 August 29 – Olof von Dalin (died 1763), Swedish poet
 October 16 – Albrecht von Haller (died 1777), Swiss physiologist and poet
 December 8 – Sir Charles Hanbury Williams (died 1759), Welsh-born English diplomat and satirical poet
 December 18 – John Collier (died 1786) English caricaturist and satirical poet known by the pseudonym "Tim(othy) Bobbin"
 Also:
 Georg Heinrich Behr (died 1761), German poet
 John Seccomb (died c. 1783), Colonial American clergyman and poet
 Elizabeth Scott (died 1776), Colonial American poet
 Thomas Seward (died 1790), English poet
 Jane Turell (died 1735), Colonial American poet, daughter of Benjamin Colman

Deaths
Birth years link to the corresponding "[year] in poetry" article:
 March 15 – William Walsh (born 1662), English poet and critic
 October 21 – Kata Szidónia Petrőczy (born 1659), Hungarian Baroque writer
 December 27 – Johanna Eleonora De la Gardie (born 1661), Swedish poet
 Also:
 Francisco Ayerra de Santa María (born 1630), first native-born Puerto Rican poet
 Pan Lei (born 1646), Chinese Qing dynasty scholar and poet

See also

Poetry
List of years in poetry
List of years in literature

Notes

 "A Timeline of English Poetry" Web page of the Representative Poetry Online Web site, University of Toronto

18th-century poetry
Poetry